The South Carolina State Lady Bulldogs women's basketball team represents South Carolina State University in women's basketball. The school competes in the Mid-Eastern Athletic Conference in Division I of the National Collegiate Athletic Association (NCAA). The  Bulldogs play home basketball games at SHM Memorial Center in Orangeburg, South Carolina.

History
The Lady Bulldogs won the MEAC Tournament four times in an eight year span from 1978 to 1986, while winning back-to-back Tournaments in 1992 and 1993, but they made only one appearance in the NCAA Tournament (1983), as the MEAC champions did not go to the NCAA Tournament again until 1994. In their only tournament appearance, they beat La Salle 85–67 in the play-in game, while losing to Tennessee 86–51 in the First Round.

Postseason

NCAA Division I

AIAW College Division/Division II
The Lady Bulldogs made three appearances in the AIAW National Division II basketball tournament, with a combined record of 7–2.

References

External links